The following lists events that happened during 1997 in South Africa.

Incumbents
 President: Nelson Mandela.
 Deputy President: Thabo Mbeki.
 Chief Justice: vacant.

Cabinet 
The Cabinet, together with the President and the Deputy President, forms part of the Executive.

National Assembly

Provincial Premiers 
 Eastern Cape Province: Raymond Mhlaba (until 4 February), Makhenkesi Stofile (since 4 February)
 Free State Province: Ivy Matsepe-Casaburri
 Gauteng Province: Tokyo Sexwale
 KwaZulu-Natal Province: Frank Mdlalose (until 1 March), Ben Ngubane (since 1 March)
 Limpopo Province: Ngoako Ramathlodi
 Mpumalanga Province: Mathews Phosa
 North West Province: Popo Molefe 
 Northern Cape Province: Manne Dipico
 Western Cape Province: Hernus Kriel

Events
February
 4 – The Constitution of South Africa comes into effect.

March
 19 – Denel and Aérospatiale sign a co-operation agreement.
 28 – President Nelson Mandela and Prime Minister of India H. D. Deve Gowda sign the Red Fort Declaration on a Strategic Partnership during Mandela's state visit to India.

April
 7 – South African soap opera Muvhango debuts on SABC 2.
 23 – Eugène Terre'Blanche, Afrikaner Weerstandsbeweging leader, is convicted of attempted murder and assault in the Magistrates Court in Potchefstroom.
 26 – Winnie Madikizela-Mandela is re-elected as president of the African National Congress's Women's League by 656 votes to 114.

August
 Dirk Coetzee, David Tshikalange and Butana Almond Nofomela, former members of the Vlakplaas counter-insurgency unit, are granted amnesty by the Truth and Reconciliation Commission in respect of the murder of Durban attorney Griffiths Mxenge in November 1981.

October
 2 – After broadcasting in its homeland for 7 months, the BBC preschool series Teletubbies premieres on South African television for the first time. The series begins on M-Net as part of its children's programming block K-T.V..
 10 – A combined version of Nkosi Sikelel' iAfrika and Die Stem van Suid-Afrika becomes the National Anthem.
 30 – The South African National Defence Force announces that it had completed destroying its stock pile of anti-personnel mines.
 South Africa and India sign the terms of reference of the India-South Africa Commercial Alliance and agreements in tourism, geology and mineral resources. The science and technology co-operation program is ratified.

December
 16–20 – The African National Congress holds its 50th National Conference in Mafikeng.

Unknown Date
 Cabinet and parliamentary approval is announced by Thabo Mbeki of the Defence Review which enables the South African National Defence Force to undertake tenders for R12bn worth of arms equipment.

Births
 11 February – Nasty C, rapper, songwriter and record producer
 3 October – Jo-Ane van Dyk, javelin thrower
 25 June – Curwin Bosch, rugby player
 23 July — Bianca Tredoux, world leader in Occupational Therapy Practices
 5 September — Lesego Kone, Public Figure.

Deaths
 16 July — Lydia Lindeque, actor. (b. 1916)
 25 November — Hastings Banda, the first president of Malawi, dies in Johannesburg (b. 1898)

Sports

Athletics
 23 February – Thabiso Moqhali from Lesotho wins the South African title in the men's marathon, clocking 2:15:31 in Pinelands.

References

South Africa
Years in South Africa
History of South Africa